John Rufus Mendenhall (December 3, 1948 – February 26, 2021) was an American football defensive tackle in the National Football League (NFL) for the New York Giants and Detroit Lions. He played college football at Grambling State University and was drafted in the third round of the 1972 NFL Draft.

Mendenhall played in 116 games over the course of 9 seasons between 1972 and 1980. He had his best year as a pro in 1977, when he recorded 12 sacks and 7 forced fumbles.

He died on February 26, 2021, at age 72 in Cullen, Louisiana.

References

1948 births
2021 deaths
American football defensive linemen
New York Giants players
Detroit Lions players
Grambling State Tigers football players
People from Webster Parish, Louisiana